Underground is the seventh studio album that Thelonious Monk recorded for Columbia Records. It features Monk on piano, Larry Gales on bass, Charlie Rouse on tenor sax, and Ben Riley on drums. This is the last Monk album featuring the Thelonious Monk Quartet.

Its cover image depicts Monk as a French Resistance fighter in the Second World War, an homage to longtime patroness and friend Pannonica de Koenigswarter, who had served in the resistance, and whose likeness also appears on the cover. It won the Grammy Award for Best Album Cover.

Music
"Green Chimneys" is named after the school attended by Monk's daughter.

For "In Walked Bud", Jon Hendricks added lyrics.

Track listing
All songs composed by Thelonious Monk unless otherwise noted.

Original LP 
Side One
 "Thelonious" - 3:14
 "Ugly Beauty" - 7:20
 "Raise Four" - 4:36
 "Boo Boo's Birthday" - 5:56

Side Two
 "Easy Street" (A.R. Jones) - 5:52
 "Green Chimneys" - 9:00
 "In Walked Bud" - 4:17

CD re-issue 
 "Thelonious" – 3:13 
 "Ugly Beauty" – 3:17
 "Raise Four" – 5:47
 "Boo Boo's Birthday" – 5:56
 "Easy Street" (Alan Rankin Jones) – 5:53
 "Green Chimneys" – 9:00
 "In Walked Bud" (Jon Hendricks, Monk) – 4:17

Special Edition 
 "Thelonious" – 3:16
 "Ugly Beauty" – 10:45
 "Raise Four" – 7:00
 "Boo Boo's Birthday (Take 11)" – 5:55
 "Easy Street" – 7:50
 "Green Chimneys" – 13:09
 "In Walked Bud" – 6:48
 "Ugly Beauty (Take 4)" – 7:37
 "Boo Boo's Birthday (Take 2)" – 5:34
 "Thelonious (Take 3)" – 3:10

Personnel

Musicians
 Thelonious Monk – piano
 Charlie Rouse – tenor saxophone
 Larry Gales – bass
 Ben Riley – drums
 Jon Hendricks – vocals on "In Walked Bud"

Production
 Teo Macero – production
 Tim Geelan – engineering
 Horn Grinner Studios – photography
 John Berg, Richard Mantel – art direction

References

Columbia Records albums
Thelonious Monk albums
1968 albums